Vid Debeljak (born 17 November 1994) is a Slovenian male canoeist who won eight medals at individual senior level at the Wildwater Canoeing World Championships and European Wildwater Championships.

References

External links
 
 

1994 births
Living people
Slovenian male canoeists
Place of birth missing (living people)
Sportspeople from Ljubljana